Pelecium is a genus of beetles in the family Carabidae, containing the following species:

 Pelecium atroviolaceum Straneo & Ball, 1989 
 Pelecium besckii (Chaudoir, 1850) 
 Pelecium bisulcatum Straneo, 1970 
 Pelecium bolivianum Straneo & Ball, 1989 
 Pelecium brasiliense Straneo, 1962 
 Pelecium cyanipes Kirby, 1817 
 Pelecium drakei Quedenfeldt, 1890 
 Pelecium faldermanni (Chaudoir, 1846) 
 Pelecium foveicolle Chaudoir, 1866 
 Pelecium fulgidum Straneo, 1962 
 Pelecium helenae Straneo & Ball, 1989 
 Pelecium laeve Chaudoir, 1854 
 Pelecium laevigatum Guerin-Meneville, 1843 
 Pelecium longicolle Straneo, 1953 
 Pelecium negrei Straneo, 1962 
 Pelecium nicki Straneo, 1955 
 Pelecium obscurum Straneo, 1955 
 Pelecium obtusum Straneo, 1953 
 Pelecium parallelum Straneo & Ball, 1989 
 Pelecium paulae Straneo & Ball, 1989 
 Pelecium punctatostriatum Straneo, 1970 
 Pelecium punctatum Straneo, 1953 
 Pelecium purpureum Straneo, 1955 
 Pelecium refulgens Guerin-Meneville, 1831 
 Pelecium renati Straneo, 1953 
 Pelecium rotundipenne Schaum, 1860 
 Pelecium semistriatum Straneo & Ball, 1989 
 Pelecium striatipenne Chaudoir, 1866 
 Pelecium striatum Straneo, 1955 
 Pelecium sulcatum Guerin-Meneville, 1843 
 Pelecium sulcipenne Chaudoir, 1861 
 Pelecium tenellum Schaum, 1860 
 Pelecium violaceum Brulle, 1838

References

Panagaeinae